Mohamed Sameer is a Sri Lankan international footballer who plays as a defender for Renown in the Sri Lanka Football Premier League.

References

Sri Lankan footballers
Renown SC players
1991 births
Living people
Sri Lanka international footballers
Association football defenders
Sri Lanka Football Premier League players